Çiğdemalan is a village the Mutki District of Bitlis Province in Turkey. Its population is 494 (2021).

References

Villages in Mutki District